Pierzchała (Roch) is a Polish coat of arms. It was used by several szlachta families in the times of the Kingdom of Poland and the Polish–Lithuanian Commonwealth.

History
One of the oldest Polish coats of arms. According to the most heraldists the proper name of it is "Pierzchała" (Pirzchała), recorded in 1409. The word "Roch" means in Polish the heraldic emblem: the rook, it has been later also used as the name (recorded in 1422).

Blazon

Notable bearers

Notable bearers of this coat of arms include:

 Klemens Pierzchała, Bishop of Płock
 House of Walewski
 Marie Walewska
 Alexandre Joseph Colonna, Count Walewski
 House of Wiszowaty
 Andrzej Wiszowaty
 Benedykt Wiszowaty
 Andrzej Wiszowaty, Jr.
Oborski family
:pl:Kategoria:Oborscy herbu Pierzchała

Gallery

See also
 Polish heraldry
 Heraldic family
 List of Polish nobility coats of arms

Related coat of arms 
 Roch III coat of arms
 Wysocki coat of arms

Bibliography

 Juliusz Karol Ostrowski Księga herbowa rodów polskich. Warszawa, 1897-1906.
 Ludwik Pierzchała Herb Pierzchała, w: "Miesięcznik Heraldyczny", t. 1, Lwów 1908
 Ludwik Pierzchała Jeszcze herb Roch, w: "Miesięcznik Heraldyczny", nr 12, Warszawa 1932
 Józef Szymański Herbarz średniowiecznego rycerstwa polskiego. Wydawnictwo Naukowe PWN, Warszawa 1993.
 Marcin Michał Wiszowaty Słoń bojowy a sprawa polska w: "Verbum Nobile. Pismo środowiska szlacheckiego" nr 11/1997.
 Gert Oswald Lexikon der Heraldik. Bibliographisches Institut, Leipzig, 1984, 

Polish coats of arms